PPG may stand for:

Science and technology 

 Pacific Proving Grounds, a former US-operated nuclear test site
 Photoplethysmograph, an optically obtained volumetric measurement of an organ
 Pterygopalatine ganglion, one of the four Parasympathetic ganglia of the head and neck
 Pteridophyte Phylogeny Group, a group promoting the taxonomy of pteridophytes

 Chemistry

 Photolabile protecting group, a strategy to temporarily protect functional group(s) and liberate upon action of light
 Policosanol, a nutritional supplement
 PPG Industries, a U.S. manufacturer
 PPG Place, its office complex
 Polypropylene glycol, a polymer
 Post-prandial glucose, a measure of blood sugar after a meal
 Pounds per gallon, a measure of density, typically of a fluid. It is common in the oil industry, especially as a unit for Mud weight.
 Purpurogallin, the aglycon of several glycosides from nutgalls

 Electronics

 PPG Phonem, a vocal synthesizer 
 Palm Products GmbH, an audio synthesizer company
 Penile plethysmograph a device to measure male arousal
 Push Proxy Gateway, a component of a WAP server in telecommunications
 Pulse pattern generator, a piece of electronic test equipment or software used to generate digital electronics stimuli

 Transport

 PPG tankette, a Soviet armoured vehicle
 IATA airport code for Pago Pago International Airport
 Powered paragliding, a form of ultralight aviation

In fiction 

 The Powerpuff Girls, an animated television series
 Powerpuff Girls Z, a Japanese TV series based on the American one
 The Powerpuff Girls (2016 TV series), a reboot of the original series

Other 

 Pittsburgh Post-Gazette, a major newspaper in the Pittsburgh, Pennsylvania region.
 Planning Policy Guidance Notes, in the United Kingdom
 Points per game in sports
 Power play goal in ice hockey
 PPG Industries